Song Lang is a 2018 Vietnamese film directed by Leon Le, co-written by Leon Le and Nguyễn Thị Minh Ngọc. It narrates the unlikely bond formed between a debt collector and a cải lương (Vietnamese opera) performer in 1980s Saigon.

Plot
Set in a richly imagined 1980s Saigon, Song Lang is a gritty underworld noir hiding a tender, romantic heart. At the film's core is the unlikely bond that develops between hunky, brooding Dũng, a tough debt collector for a ruthless loan shark, and Linh Phụng, a charismatic young opera singer for a struggling company that performs cải lương, a modern form of traditional Vietnamese folk opera.

The two meet when Dũng comes to forcefully collect a debt from the opera troupe, but when their paths cross again, a friendship—and then more—develops, awakening surprising, tender feelings in both men. Their story, too, soon scales operatic heights. With his first feature film, director Leon Le has delivered a rich drama: a smoldering relationship between two apparent opposites—equally uncompromising—set against the backdrop of a gorgeous, fading art form.

Production
The script was initially rejected by many almost all of the producers in Vietnam before it was picked up by Veronica Ngo from Studio68. Ngo wanted the two main characters Dũng and Linh Phụng to have more on screen physical contact, but Le firmly refused. When asked about his choice of actors, Le stated that he saw Phung's "fragility and loneliness" in Isaac whereas newcomer Liên Bỉnh Phát has the appearance and soul of Dung.

Most of the urban scenes were shot in Hồ Chí Minh City's District 5 as Le considered it to still have the rustic beauty that the entire city once had.

Reception
To date, the film has won a total of 52 awards, including Gemstone Award at Tokyo International Film Festival, Audience Choice Award at the 2019 editions of New York Asian Film Festival, Seattle LGBT Film Festival, Viet Film Fest, Asian American Int' Film Festival, Frameline San Francisco International LGBTQ Film Festival, Madrid's LGBT film festival LesGaiCineMad and Best New Director at Beijing International Film Festival.

Online publication New Mandala praised Song Lang for "its honest portrait of Saigon as a city in the middle of cultural, social and political transitions" and "microscopic attention to objects that were used in the everyday lives of Saigonese at that time" and The Hollywood Reporter called it "a uniquely Vietnamese hybrid of Wong Kar-wai's In the Mood for Love and Richard Linklater's Before Sunrise".

References

External links

Song Lang - Behind the Curtain

Films set in the 1980s
Films set in Saigon
Vietnamese drama films
Vietnamese LGBT-related films
LGBT-related drama films
2018 LGBT-related films
Films about musical theatre